A Young Man in a Fur Cap and a Cuirass (probably a Self Portrait) is a 1654 portrait painting by Carel Fabritius. It is an oil painting on canvas of 70.5 by 61.5 cm (27.8 by 24.2 in). The painting is generally considered to be a self-portrait. The work has been in the collection of the National Gallery in London since 1924.

References 

1654 paintings
Paintings by Carel Fabritius
Self-portraits